Górzno-Lidzbark Landscape Park (Górznieńsko-Lidzbarski Park Krajobrazowy) is a protected area (Landscape Park) in north-central Poland, established in 1990, covering an area of .

The Park is shared between three voivodeships: Kuyavian-Pomeranian, Masovian and Warmian-Masurian. Within Kuyavian-Pomeranian Voivodeship it lies in Brodnica County (Gmina Brzozie, Gmina Górzno, Gmina Bartniczka, Gmina Świedziebnia). Within Masovian Voivodeship it lies in Żuromin County (Gmina Lubowidz). Within Warmian-Masurian Voivodeship it lies in Działdowo County (Gmina Lidzbark).

Within the Landscape Park are six nature reserves.

References

Landscape parks in Poland
Parks in Kuyavian-Pomeranian Voivodeship